The diocesan system of the Catholic church government in Spain consists mainly of a nearly entirely Latin hierarchy of 70 territorial (arch)dioceses :
 fourteen ecclesiastical provinces, each headed by a metropolitan archbishop (one of which, Toledo, uses the Mozarabic rite), have a total of 55 suffragan Bishops.

Exempt, i.e. directly subject to the Holy See, are :
 the (vacant) Latin Titular Patriarchate of the West Indies
 the Spanish military ordinariate, which is a Latin army bishopric (personal diocese for the military) headed by an archbishop
 the bishopric of Gibraltar, also Latin
 the joint Ordinariate for the Faithful of Eastern Rite  for all Eastern Catholics in Spain.

All except the Exempt Bishop of Gibraltar are members of the national episcopal conference of Spain.

There is also an apostolic nunciature (papal embassy) to Spain (in national capital Madrid), into which is also vested the nunciature to Andorra. Gibraltar, being British overseas territory without sovereignty (and disputed by Spain), has no papal diplomatic representation.

Exempt current jurisdictions

Latin 
 Military Archbishopric of Spain, personal archbishopric for the Spanish armed forces

Eastern Rite Ordinariate 
 Ordinariate for the Faithful of Eastern Rite in Spain

Current Latin provinces

Ecclesiastical province of Barcelona 
 Metropolitan Archdiocese of Barcelona
 Diocese of Sant Feliu de Llobregat
 Diocese of Terrassa

Ecclesiastical province of Burgos 
 Metropolitan Archdiocese of Burgos
 Diocese of Bilbao
 Diocese of Osma-Soria
 Diocese of Palencia
 Diocese of Vitoria

Ecclesiastical province of Granada 
 Metropolitan Archdiocese of Granada
 Diocese of Almería
 Diocese of Cartagena
 Diocese of Guadix
 Diocese of Jaén
 Diocese of Málaga

Ecclesiastical province of Madrid 
 Metropolitan Archdiocese of Madrid
 Diocese of Alcalá de Henares
 Diocese of Getafe

Ecclesiastical province of Mérida-Badajoz 
 Metropolitan Archdiocese of Mérida-Badajoz
 Diocese of Coria-Cáceres
 Diocese of Plasencia

Ecclesiastical province of Oviedo 
 Metropolitan Archdiocese of Oviedo
 Diocese of Astorga
 Diocese of León
 Diocese of Santander

Ecclesiastical province of Pamplona 
 Metropolitan Archdiocese of Pamplona y Tudela
 Diocese of Calahorra and La Calzada-Logroño
 Diocese of Jaca
 Diocese of San Sebastián

Ecclesiastical province of Santiago de Compostela 
 Metropolitan Archdiocese of Santiago de Compostela
 Diocese of Lugo
 Diocese of Mondoñedo-Ferrol
 Diocese of Ourense
 Diocese of Tui-Vigo

Ecclesiastical province of Seville 
 Metropolitan Archdiocese of Seville
 Diocese of Cádiz and Ceuta, which includes the Spanish exclaves in Morocco
 Diocese of Córdoba
 Diocese of Huelva
 Diocese of Canarias
 Diocese of Jerez de la Frontera
 Diocese of San Cristóbal de La Laguna

Ecclesiastical province of Tarragona 
 Metropolitan Archdiocese of Tarragona
 Diocese of Girona
 Diocese of Lleida
 Diocese of Solsona
 Diocese of Tortosa
 Diocese of Urgell, which includes Andorra, where he is prince-bishop as joint head of state (with the French president)
 Diocese of Vic

Ecclesiastical province of Toledo 
 Metropolitan Archdiocese of Toledo, which uses the Mozarabic Rite
 Diocese of Albacete
 Diocese of Ciudad Real
 Diocese of Cuenca
 Diocese of Sigüenza-Guadalajara

Ecclesiastical province of Valencia 
 Metropolitan Archdiocese of Valencia
 Diocese of Ibiza
 Diocese of Majorca
 Diocese of Menorca
 Diocese of Orihuela-Alicante
 Diocese of Segorbe-Castellón

Ecclesiastical province of Valladolid 
 Metropolitan Archdiocese of Valladolid
 Diocese of Ávila
 Diocese of Ciudad Rodrigo
 Diocese of Salamanca
 Diocese of Segovia
 Diocese of Zamora

Ecclesiastical province of Zaragoza 
 Metropolitan Archdiocese of Zaragoza
 Diocese of Barbastro-Monzón
 Diocese of Huesca
 Diocese of Tarazona
 Diocese of Teruel and Albarracín

Titular sees 
(Excluding the current but vacant Latin titular patriarchate, above)
 Forty-eight Titular bishoprics (all Episcopal): Diocese of Abula, Diocese of Acci, Diocese of Álava, Diocese of Algeciras, Diocese of Amaia, Diocese of Arcavica, Diocese of Assidona ? Asidonia, Diocese of Auca, Diocese of Baeza, Diocese of Basti (Baza), Diocese of Besalú, Diocese of Bigastro, Diocese of Britonia, Diocese of Castulo, Diocese of Celene, Diocese of Denia, Diocese of Écija, Diocese of Egabro, Diocese of Egara, Diocese of Elepla, Diocese of Elicroca, Diocese of Elo, Diocese of Emerita Augusta (now Mérida(-Badajoz), again suppressed as titular see), Diocese of Fuerteventura, Diocese of Iliturgi, Illiberi (Elvira / Eliberi / Granada / Ilurir), Diocese of Illici, Diocese of Ipagro, Diocese of Iria Flavia, Diocese of Italica, Diocese of Mentesa, Diocese of Naiera (Najéra), Diocese of Oreto, Diocese of Rota, Diocese of Rotdon, Diocese of Rubicon, Diocese of Saetabis, Diocese of Sasabe, Diocese of Segia, Diocese of Segisama, Diocese of Telde, Diocese of Tucci, Diocese of Urci, Diocese of Ursona, Diocese of Valabria, Diocese of Valeria, Diocese of Valliposita, Diocese of Vergi

Other 
(Excluding mere predecessors of current sees)
 Roman Catholic Diocese of Albarracin
 Roman Catholic Diocese of Ceuta
 Roman Catholic Diocese of Tudela

Gallery of Archdioceses

Sources and external links 
 GCatholic.org - Spain.
 GCatholic.org - Andorra.
 GCatholic.org - Gibraltar.
 Catholic-Hierarchy entry.

Spain
Roman Catholic Dioceses